Megahertzia is a monotypic genus of flowering plants in the family Proteaceae. The sole species, Megahertzia amplexicaulis, is endemic to Queensland. It is found only in part of the Wet Tropics World Heritage Area between the Daintree River and Cape Tribulation.

The name Megahertzia is a pun on Roaring Meg Creek, where one of the original specimens was collected. It is derived from the Greek megas (meaning large) and hertz, the unit of measurement for sound frequency.

References

Proteaceae
Endemic flora of Queensland
Monotypic Proteaceae genera
Taxa named by Bernard Hyland
Taxa named by Alex George